Black Mountain railway station is a heritage-listed railway station at Main Northern railway, Black Mountain, Armidale Regional Council, New South Wales, Australia. The property was added to the New South Wales State Heritage Register on 2 April 1999.

History 

Black Mountain station opened on 19 August 1884 as Boorolong station. It was renamed Black Mountain in 1886. The station closed in 1987.

The station complex is now maintained by a local community group, the Black Mountain Preservation Society.

Description 

The brick main station building is of a type 4 standard roadside design with a brick platform, and was completed in 1884. The landscaping around the platform and entrance and the station fences and signs are also heritage-listed.

Heritage listing 

Black Mountain station group is an excellent intact station from the 1880s with a very good timber residence of unusual design (no longer owned by State Rail). The quality of the buildings marks the importance of the area in the pastoral development of the State and are an important and integral part of the townscape. This site illustrates the confidence in railway construction during the 1880s boom even in remote locations of the State.

Black Mountain railway station was listed on the New South Wales State Heritage Register on 2 April 1999 having satisfied the following criteria.

The place possesses uncommon, rare or endangered aspects of the cultural or natural history of New South Wales.

This item is assessed as historically rare. This item is assessed as arch. rare. This item is assessed as socially rare.

See also 

List of disused regional railway stations in New South Wales

References

Attribution 

New South Wales State Heritage Register
Disused regional railway stations in New South Wales
Articles incorporating text from the New South Wales State Heritage Register
Railway stations in Australia opened in 1884
Main North railway line, New South Wales
Railway stations closed in 1987